The 2018 IGLFA World Championship was the 23rd officially recognized world championship event for the IGLFA.  It was held in Paris, France from August 5 through 11 as the football (soccer) competition part of the 2018 Gay Games. Panamboyz United and FC Paris Arc en ciel served as the official co-hosts of the tournament, with support from the IGLFA and French Football Federation.  All matches took place at Tremblay Park.

Federal Triangles Soccer Club (FTSC) were the defending world champions, while Stonewall F.C. were four-time defending Gay Games champions.

Nearly 900 participants in roughly 60 teams - some for 11v11 competition, some for 7v7 - were registered for the championship. They represented 54 different clubs from 19 total nations. This made the IGLFA competition at the 2018 Gay Games the largest IGFLA world championship event since the 19th IGLFA championship (played as part of the 2010 Gay Games) in Cologne.

In the men's 11s D1 final, West Hollywood Soccer Club (LA Eclipse) beat Village Manchester FC on penalties after a 1 - 1 draw, winning the IGLFA again 21 years after their last win (as LA Suns) in 1997.

Tournament structure
Two weeks before the tournament, the official Paris 2018 website and the Facebook event for the tournament differed slightly in the number of teams per competition and in available competitions. The official site claimed 14 DI men's 11s teams, 21 DII men's 11s teams, 8 DI men's 7s teams, 6 DII Men's 7s teams, and 11 Women's 7s teams; the official Facebook event claims 32 Men's 11s teams (down from 35) that would be split evenly into DI and DII after the preliminary phase, 14 men's 7s teams (no divisional split), and 12 women's 7s teams (up from 11). (All men's teams are open to have female participants.)

Co-hosts Panamboyz United clarified the discrepancy in a Facebook post, confirming the absolute merger of the men's 7s competition and the preliminary-phase merger of the men's 11s competition, the latter similar to what occurred in the IGLFA Unity Cup the previous year. That is, the men's 11s competition will begin with all 32 teams pooled into group regardless of registered division, followed by two separate knockout brackets, with the 16 higher-ranked teams from the groups in the "DI" bracket and the 16 lower-ranked teams from the groups in the "DII" bracket. As each team in the 11s competition was guaranteed to play 7 games (all 60 minutes except for the medal-qualifying semifinals and finals which will be a full 90 minutes each), this suggested that the losers in any round of the knockout phase will play fellow losers in subsequent rounds for a total of four placements games per team after their three group games. The groups in the 11s competition would be structured such that each team was only expected to play one opponent who initially registered for the other division - with the exception of one group, the exception likely a function of the fact that initial registration on the official website suggested 50% more DII teams than DI teams.

However, official tournament documents released the Sunday before games started revealed further alterations to the tournament format. The Men's 7s competition was reduced back to 14 teams (after 15 had been previously posted to Facebook), and was split back into an 8-team DI bracket and 6-team DII group phase for placement games. The Women's 7s competition was reduced to 10 teams, and would include two 4-team playoff brackets and one return game for the 9th and 10th teams. Finally, the Men's 11s competition would include four 8-team playoff brackets instead of two 16-team playoff brackets, reducing the total number of games per team from seven to six. The four brackets were called D1, D2 elite, D2-B (effectively D3), and D2-C (effectively D4), where each playoff bracket would include the 8 teams who finished in the corresponding ranks in the eight 4-team groups. The official website was also ultimately updated to show these changes in team counts.

Further slight changes to both 7s competitions were required after one team in each forfeited out of their last group stage match, in addition to one women's team forfeiting the entire competition the morning the group stage began.

Participating clubs
Co-hosts FC Paris Arc en ciel posted the official list of participating teams to Facebook the day after the tournament structure was announced, (with an additional men's 7s team,) though did not specify whether the men's/open teams had initially registered as DI or DII. The official list was later updated before games began, revealing the addition of Ballboys Hamburg in a joint team with Panamboyz United, two team mergers in the Women's competition as well as the addition of the SF Spikes to the Philadelphia Falcon's squad, and one merger in the Men's 7s competition. Trophies were awarded to the top three teams in D1, D2 Elite (DII), and both 7s competitions, and to the top teams in D2-B (DIII) and D2-C (DIV).

<small>* columns for the 7s competitions are divided by which teams qualified for the medals brackets× team forfeited before/during group stage# team forfeited before/during finals stage</small>

By nationClubs in italics have won multiple IGLFA medals at previous events. Individual team name as they appear in the team announcement Google Drive are in parentheses.Algeria (1): Haraga United
Argentina (1): Los Dogos DAGAustralia (2): The Flying Bats Women's Football Club, Sydney Rangers FC
Austria (1): (Cluj & Graz & Nice United)
Brazil (2): BeesCats Soccer Boys, Estrela Nova
Canada (2): Toronto United, Vancouver United
Czech Republic (1): GFC Friends Prague
England (10): East End Phoenix FC, Hackney Women's FC, Leftfooters FC (LeftDevils FC), London Falcons FC, London Titans FC, Soho FC, Stonewall FC (Cubs; Lions; Pride), Trowbridge Tigers FC, Village Manchester FC (first; reserves), Yorkshire Terriers FC
France (9): ARDHIS FC, BNP Paribas, Caramellas Nice (Cluj & Graz & Nice United), FC Paris Arc en ciel, Les Fuegos, Panamboyz United, Racing Pop, Rosa Bonheur, SUD AU CUL
Germany (3): Ballboys Hamburg, Kaethes Tanten, Streetboys München (Team München e.V.)
Ireland (2): Cork Rebels FC, Dublin Devils FC (LeftDevils FC)
Japan (1): (GMadrid-Samurai)
Mexico (3): Didesex AC, Lobos Mexico, Zorros Mexico
Netherlands (1): ADA The Hauge
Romania (1): (Cluj & Graz & Nice United)
Scotland (1): HotScots FC
Spain (1): (GMadrid-Samurai)
Sweden (1): Stockholm Snipers IF
United States (11): Austin Goldstars (Jacks & Goldstars), Boston Strikers, Federal Triangles Soccer Club (Rainbow Unicorns; Balls Deep State; FTSC/Falcons), Minnesota Gray Ducks, New York Ramblers (Ramblers; 7s; Steal Your Manblers), Philadelphia Falcons, Rain City Soccer Club (Jet City Strikers), San Francisco Spikes, San Diego Sparks, Twin City Jacks (Jacks & Goldstars), West Hollywood SCResults
Preliminary stage

Men's 11s

Women's 7s

Men's 7sScheduled crossover matches were 1v3, 2v2, and 3v1Finals stage
Men's 11s DIPlacement bracketMen's 11s DIICalled "D2 Elite" in tournament documentsPlacement bracketWomen's 7s DI

Women's 7s placement

Men's 7s DI

Men's 7s placementLosers' bracketLower placement''
The intended group phase for the lower Men's 7s teams was abandoned when one of the five remaining teams after the group phase (Racing Pop) also forfeited. Of the four "group" matches scheduled for August 9, only two were played, with each of the four remaining teams having played one game each. Thus, the competition was adapted to treat the played games as placement semifinals.

Full time results

Men's 11s
1-   West Hollywood SC (Los Angeles, USA) (D1 gold medal)
2-   Village Manchester FC First (Manchester, UK) (D1 silver medal)
3-   Stonewall FC Lions (London, UK) (D1 bronze medal)
4-   Dublin Devils FC (Dublin, Ireland) 
5-   Stockholm Snipers IF (Stockholm, Sweden)
6-   Ardhis FC (France)
7-   New York Ramblers (New York, USA)
8-   Los Dogos (Buenos Aires, Argentina)
9-   Stonewall FC Cubs (London, UK) (D2 gold medal)
10-  FTSC Rainbow Unicorns (Washington, DC, USA) (D2 silver medal)
11-  Minnesota Gray Ducks Soccer (Minneapolis, USA) (D3 bronze medal)
12-  Lobos México LGBT (Ciudad de Mexico, Mexico)
13-  Team München Streetboys (Munchen, Germany) 
14-  Toronto United (Toronto, Canada) 
15-  Yorkshire Terriers FC (Leeds, UK)
16-  Sydney Rangers FC (Sydney, Australia)
17-  Panamboyz United/Ballboys Hamburg (Paris, France/Hamburg, Germany)
18-  Didesex Deporte Lgbt (Ciudad de Mexico, Mexico)
19-  Jet City Strikers Rain City SC (Seattle, USA) 
20-  London Falcons FC (London, UK)
21-  GMadrid Sports/Samurai (Madrid, Spain/Japan) 
22-  San Diego Sparks (San Diego, USA) 
23-  HotScots FC (Edinburgh, Scotland, UK)
24-  Boston Strikers Soccer Club (Boston, USA)
25-  San Francisco Spikes SC (San Francisco, USA)
26-  London Titans FC (London, UK)
27-  Stonewall FC Pride (London, UK)
28-  TC Jacks/Austin Goldstars (Minnesota/Austin, USA) 
29-  Vancouver United OFK (Vancouver, Canada)
30-  East End Phoenix FC (London, UK)
31-  Village Manchester FC Reserves (Manchester, UK)
32-  FTSC Balls Deep State (Washington, DC, USA)

Men's 7s
1-   Sud Au Cul (France) (gold medal)
2-   BeesCats Soccer Boys (Rio de Janeiro, Brazil) (silver medal)
3-   NYR Steal Your Manblers (New York, USA) (bronze medal)
4-   FTSC/Falconsoccer (Washington/Philadelphia, USA)
5-   GFC Friends Prague (Prague, Czechia)
6-   Cork Rebels FC (Cork, Ireland)
7-   Soho FC (London, UK) 
8-   Trowbridge Tigers FC (Trowbridge, UK)
9-   NY Ramblers 7s (New York, USA)
10-  Leftdevils Leftfooters/Dublin Devils (London, UK/Dublin, Ireland)
11-  Zorros LGBT (Ciudad de Mexico, Mexico)
12-  Boston Strikers Soccer Club (Boston, USA)
13-  Racing Pop (France)
14-  Haraga United/BNP Paribas (Algeria/France)

Women's 7s
1-   Rosa Bonheur (France) (gold medal)
2-   Didesex/Hackney (Mexico/London, UK) (silver medal)
3-   Philadelphia Flacons/SF Spikes (Philadelphia/San Francisco, USA) (bronze medal)
4-   Flying Bats WFC (Australia)
5-   FC Paris Arc en Ciel (France)
6-   Les Fuegos (France)
7-   Kaethes Tanten (Germany)
8-   Cluj/Graz/Nice United (Romania/Germany/France)

References

International LGBT sports organizations
I
I
I
I
I